West Hall at West Hall Road, Kew, in the London Borough of Richmond upon Thames, is a Grade II listed building dating from the end of the 17th century. It is Kew's only surviving 17th-century building apart from Kew Palace.

History
The house stands on what was described in 1386 as an estate of 160 acres. This was included in Mortlake Manor, which was owned by the Archbishops of Canterbury.

By the end of the 15th century, West Hall estate had become part of the new manor of East Sheen and West Hall.

The late 17th-century house was probably built by the lord of the manor, Thomas Juxon, who lived in East Sheen, as a house to let. A second substantial house to let, Brick Farm, was built just to the west.  This later became the home of Sir William Hooker, the first Director of Kew Gardens, who rented the house and renamed it West Park. The estates of both houses were let out for grazing and market gardening.

In 1813 the painter William Harriott is recorded as living at West Hall. He was the son of the miniaturist Diana Hill, who also lived at the Hall.

Although the house of West Hall remains, and the property includes gardens and cottages, much of its estate, and that of the neighbouring Brick Farm, has now been redeveloped for housing.

The roof and upper floor of the house were damaged by fire in 2005. In 2007 the house was restored by the Bissell Thomas family.

West Hall in popular culture
Joanna Lumley was filmed at West Hall in the mid-1990s for her television series Class Act.

References

Sources
 Blomfield, David: Kew Past, Chichester, Sussex: Phillimore & Co. Ltd., 1994, 

1600s establishments in England

Grade II listed buildings in the London Borough of Richmond upon Thames
Grade II listed houses in London
History of the London Borough of Richmond upon Thames
Houses in the London Borough of Richmond upon Thames
Kew, London